Tim Spears (born 27 July 1984) is a rugby league footballer who plays as a  and  for the York City Knights in Betfred Championship.

He has previously played for the Castleford Tigers (Heritage № 801) in the Super League, the Dewsbury Rams, the Batley Bulldogs and the Featherstone Rovers (captain) (Heritage № 926).

Spears joined Featherstone in 2009 and was part of the team that topped the Championship for four consecutive seasons before being appointed captain for the 2014 season. In January 2014, Spears lay claim the fastest ever rugby league try when it took just 7.7 seconds to score from the kick off in a trial game against Wakefield Trinity Wildcats.

In December 2016 Spears signed a one-year deal with York which was extended for the 2018 season.

References

External links
York City Knights profile
 (archived by archive.is) Profile at featherstonerovers.net
 Batley Bulldogs profile

1984 births
Living people
Batley Bulldogs players
Castleford Tigers players
Dewsbury Rams players
English rugby league players
Featherstone Rovers captains
Featherstone Rovers players
Rugby league locks
Rugby league second-rows
York City Knights players